Mohammad Alidjani-Momer (born 26 February 1951) is an Iranian sports shooter. He competed in the mixed trap event at the 1976 Summer Olympics.

References

External links

1951 births
Living people
Iranian male sport shooters
Olympic shooters of Iran
Shooters at the 1976 Summer Olympics
Place of birth missing (living people)
20th-century Iranian people